Sapardi Djoko Damono (20 March 1940 – 19 July 2020) was an Indonesian poet known for lyrical poems, and who was widely regarded as the pioneer of lyrical poetry in Indonesia. He died in South Tangerang, Banten on 19 July 2020 after a long illness.

Early life 

Sapardi attended grammar school at Sekolah Dasar Kasatriyan in his home town of Surakarta (also known as Solo), and from there he went on to junior high and high school at SMP 2 and SMA 2. He was an avid reader from an early age, and was a frequent visitor to the local libraries around Solo. His interests were broad, ranging from the works of Karl May, William Saroyan, and Pramoedya Ananta Toer, to comics by R.A. Kosasih. Eventually Sapardi, together with one of his younger siblings, began a lending library in their neighbourhood.

Sapardi began writing poetry while still in high school in Surakarta. After his graduation from high school, Sapardi moved to Yogyakarta to study at the English division of the Literature department at Gajah Mada University, and later completed his graduate studies in Indonesian literature. During this period he also became involved in radio broadcasting and the theater, as well as writing poetry. Sapardi's literary career developed alongside his academic career.

Career 

After graduating from UGM, Sapardi taught in a number of places, including Madiun, Solo, and Diponegoro University in Semarang, before moving to the United States for a brief period. In 1973, after his return from the US, he became a permanent faculty member in the Literature Department at the University of Indonesia. In 1989 he received his doctorate from the same university, and in 1993 became a full professor.

His first collection of poetry, DukaMu Abadi (Your Eternal Sorrow), was released in 1969. The focus of DukaMu Abadi is on the pain of the individual who questions existence, and unlike many of his literary peers of this time, Sapardi's poetry focused more on the human condition rather than revolutionary and social ideas. In 1974, he published Mata Pisau (Knife) and Akuarium (Aquarium). These were followed by Perahu Kertas (Paper Boat) and Sihir Hujan (Rain Spell), and in 1986 he received the ASEAN-sponsored SEA-Write Award for poetry. In 1987, he was one of several prominent Indonesian figures (Goenawan Mohamad, Subagio Sastrowardoyo, Umar Kayam, and John H. McGlynn) involved in the establishment of the Lontar Foundation. To mark the foundation's inauguration, a collection of Sapardi's poems, entitled "Suddenly the Night" was released. In 1998/1999, Sapardi wrote about the social turbulence resulting from the fall of the New Order regime. This resulted in the book Ayat-ayat Api (Verses of Fire), which received some negative criticism, largely due to the angry tone of the work which differed markedly from his normal style. His best known works include Hujan Bulan Juni (A June Rain) and Berjalan ke Barat di Waktu Pagi Hari (Walking to the West in the Morning). Hujan Bulan Juni, one of his most popular works, was published in 1994. Containing 95 poems, including a selection of his poems from 1964 to 1992, the book has been described as a kind of "greatest hits" of Sapardi. Some of the poems included were written during a year spent at the University of Hawaii in Honolulu in the early 1970s.

Sapardi has also completed a number of translations of literary works from other countries into Indonesian. These include the literary works of T.S. Eliot, Khalil Gibran and Jalaludin Rumi; his translation of Ernest Hemingway's The Old Man and the Sea is considered among Indonesia's best.

Sapardi's poems have also formed the inspiration behind several musical compositions, most notably by Indonesia's international-acclaimed pianist Ananda Sukarlan. Several singers have also released albums using his poetry: Hujan Bulan Juni (1990), Hujan Dalam Komposisi (Rain in Composition) (1990) Gadis Kecil (Young Girl) (2006) and Becoming Dew (2007). The duo  AriReda (composed of Reda Gaudiamo and Ari Malibu) also set his compositions to music. In the realm of film, Aku Ingin (I Want) has been rearranged into a soundtrack by musician Dwiki Dharmawan for Garin Nugroho's 1991 film Cinta dalam Sepotong Roti (Love Is in a Slice of Bread).

He was a professor at the University of Indonesia. Damono's extensive and intensive involvement in the university has borne him the unofficial title 'Professor of Indonesian Poets'. He was once elected dean of the faculty. His poetry continues to enjoy wide popular appeal.  A poetry recital, arranged to celebrate his 70th birthday in March 2010, was packed out with people of all ages and from all walks of life, queuing to enter the venue.

Awards 
Sapardi Djoko Damono has received a number of awards in recognition of his work. Included among these are:
The Putera Poetry Award in 1983
The Jakarta Arts Council Literary Award in 1984
The SEA Write Award in 1986
The Achmad Bakrie Award for Literature in 2003.
The Akademi Jakarta Award in 2012

Publications

Poetry 
Duka-Mu Abadi (Your Eternal Sorrow). Bandung: Jeihan, 1969
Akuarium. Jakarta: Puisi Indonesia, 1974
Mata Pisau (Blade). Jakarta: Balai Pustaka, 1974
Perahu Kertas (Paper Boat). Jakarta, Balai Pustaka, 1983
Sihir Hujan (Rain Doctor). Kuala Lumpur: Dewan Bahasa dan Pustaka, 1983
Kesusastraan Indonesia Modern: Beberapa Catatan, Jakarta: Gramedia, 1983
Arloji, Jakarta
H.B. Jassin 70 Tahun, Jakarta: Gramedia, 1987
Suddenly the Night, Jakarta: Lontar Foundation, 1988
Hujan Bulan Juni: Pilihan Sajak, Jakarta: Grasindo, 1994
PolitikIdeologi dan Sastra Hibrida, Jakarta: Pabelan Jayakarta, 1999
Ayat-Ayat Api, Jakarta: Pustaka Firdaus, 2000
Arloji (Wristwatch), 2000
Mata Jendela (The Window's Eye), 2001
Ada Berita Apa Hari Ini, Den Sastro? (What's the News Today, Den Sastro?), 2002
Before Dawn, 2005
Namaku Sita, 2012
Dan Sutradara Itu Menghapus Dialog Kita, 2012

Fiction 
Pengarang Telah Mati (The Author is Dead), 2001
Membunuh Orang Gila (To Kill a Madman), 2003
Trilogi Soekram, Gramedia Pustaka Utama: 2015
Hujan Bulan Juni, Gramedia Pustaka Utama: 2015

Non-fiction 
Sosiologi Sastra: Sebuah pengantar ringkas (A Brief Introduction to the Sociology of Literature), 1977
Novel Sastra Indonesia Sebelum Parang (1979)
Sastra Indonesia Modern: Beberapa Catatan (Modern Indonesian Literature: Scattered Notes), 1982
Bilang Begini, Maksudnya Begitu (1990)
Politik, Ideologi dan Sastra Hibrida (Politics, Ideology and Hybrid Literature), 1999
Sihir Rendra: Permainan Makna (Rendra the Magician: The Play of Meaning), 1999
Priayi Abangan (The Lapsed Bourgeois), 2000
Puisi Indonesia Sebelum Kemerdekaan (Indonesian Poetry Before Independence), 2004
Jejak Realisme dalam Sastra Indonesia (Traces of Realism in Indonesian Literature), 2005

References

External links 
 Sapardi Djoko Damono.  Bakdi Soemanto. 2006
 Biography of Damono, Sapardi Djoko | Southeast Asia Digital Library

1940 births
2020 deaths
People from Surakarta
20th-century Indonesian poets
Javanese people
Academic staff of the University of Indonesia
S.E.A. Write Award winners
Place of birth missing
21st-century Indonesian poets
Indonesian male poets
20th-century male writers
21st-century male writers
Gadjah Mada University alumni